The event was being held for the first time since 1977.

Colin Dibley and Chris Kachel won the title, defeating John Alexander and Phil Dent 6–7, 7–6, 6–4 in the final.

Seeds

  Ross Case /  Geoff Masters (semifinals)
  Mark Edmondson /  John Marks (first round)
  John Alexander /  Phil Dent (final)
  Colin Dibley /  Chris Kachel (champions)

Draw

Draw

References
Draw

Next Generation Adelaide International
1979 Grand Prix (tennis)
Doubles